This page lists the results of leadership elections held by the Progressive Conservative Party of Newfoundland and Labrador. After the defeat of the party's first leader in the 1949 general election and until 1966 the party leadership was officially vacant and the House leader served as de facto party leader.

1949 leadership convention

(Held April 8, 1949)
Harry Mews acclaimed

Developments 1949-1966
Mews was defeated in the 1949 general election and resigned sometime afterward. John Gilbert Higgins was elected House leader and became the first post-Confederation Leader of the Opposition. Higgins retired at the 1951 general election, and Peter Cashin was elected House leader afterwards. Cashin resigned on January 26, 1953, and Malcolm Hollett was elected to succeed him. Hollett was defeated in the 1959 general election and James J. Greene was elected as his replacement. Greene resigned on January 14, 1966, and Noel Murphy was chosen acting leader.

1966 leadership convention

(Held on April 30, 1966)

Noel Murphy elected
Albert Boyle Butt
(Note: the vote totals were not released)

Murphy was defeated in the 1966 general election and Gerry Ottenheimer was elected House leader.

1967 leadership convention

(Held on May 13, 1967)

Gerry Ottenheimer acclaimed

Ottenheimer resigned on November 11, 1969. Party President William Marshall was made interim leader and Anthony Joseph Murphy was chosen House leader.

1970 leadership convention

(Held on May 16, 1970)

Frank Moores 425
Hubert Kitchen 91
Walter Carter 50
John A. Carter 41
Joseph Noel 2
Hugh Shea 2
Frank Howard-Rose 1

1979 leadership convention

(Held March 17, 1979)

First Ballot:
Brian Peckford 200
C. William Doody 157
Leo Barry 87
Walter Carter 84
James Morgan 56
Ed Maynard 26
Tom Hickey 24
Ralph Trask 2
Kenneth R.J. Prowse 0
Dorothy Wyatt 0

Second Ballot (Maynard, Hickey, Trask, Prowse and Wyatt eliminated and Morgan withdrew):
Brian Peckford 272
C. William Doody 184
Leo Barry 99
Walter Carter 83

Third Ballot (Carter eliminated.):
Brian Peckford 331
C. William Doody 208
Leo Barry 80

1989 leadership convention

(Held on March 11, 1989)

First Ballot:
Tom Rideout 313
Len Simms 262
Neil Windsor 109
Loyola Hearn 83
Hal Barrett 22

Second Ballot (Barrett eliminated):
Tom Rideout 363
Len Simms 318
Neil Windsor 64
Loyola Hearn 38

Third Ballot (Hearn eliminated, Windsor withdrew):
Tom Rideout 403
Len Simms 377

1991 leadership convention

(Held October 19, 1991)

Len Simms acclaimed

1995 leadership convention

(Held April 29, 1995)

Lynn Verge 361
Loyola Sullivan 358

Verge was defeated in the 1996 general election and Sullivan was appointed interim leader.

1998 leadership convention

(Held March 7, 1998)

Ed Byrne acclaimed

2001 leadership convention

(Held April 7, 2001)

Danny Williams acclaimed

Williams resigned as premier and party leader on December 3, 2010. Kathy Dunderdale was chosen interim leader and premier.

2011 leadership convention

(Held April 2, 2011)

Kathy Dunderdale acclaimed

2014 leadership conventions

March 2014
(Held March 2014)
Frank Coleman acclaimed, declined

September 2014
(Held September 13, 2014) 
 = Eliminated from next round
 = Winner

2018 leadership convention

For the first time in the party's history, the voting was conducted through a one-member, one-vote points system, which divided the province into forty districts worth a hundred points each. The points were allocated based on each candidates share of the popular vote. 11,000 members joined the party during this leadership election, of which, just over 4,000 cast their ballots. St. John's lawyer Ches Crosbie won.

2023 leadership convention

A leadership election will be held following the resignation of Ches Crosbie. The leadership convention will be held on October 13 – 15, 2023 at the Sheraton Hotel in St. John’s. Candidate nominations will open May 17, 2023, and close June 16, 2023. The new leader will be announced on October 14, 2023.

See also
Leadership convention
Progressive Conservative Party of Newfoundland and Labrador

References

Carty, Kenneth R., et al., Leaders and Parties in Canadian Politics: Experiences of the Provinces. Harcourt Brace Jovanovich Canada, 1992.

 
Conservatism-related lists